Caroline Rachel Casey (born May 27, 1994) is an American soccer player who played as a goalkeeper for Sky Blue FC in the NWSL.

Education
Casey completed her undergraduate education at the College of William & Mary in Williamsburg, VA in 2016 with a degree in Kinesiology and Health Sciences.

Career

Sky Blue FC, 2016–2018
Casey was drafted by Sky Blue FC with the 29th overall pick in the 2016 NWSL College Draft.

References

External links
William & Mary bio
 

1994 births
Living people
American women's soccer players
William & Mary Tribe women's soccer players
NJ/NY Gotham FC players
National Women's Soccer League players
NJ/NY Gotham FC draft picks
Women's association football goalkeepers
Sportspeople from Chesapeake, Virginia
Soccer players from Norfolk, Virginia
Soccer players from Virginia Beach